The Glass Cage is a 1957 play by J.B. Priestley.

It originally premiered at the Crest Theatre in Toronto before transferring to London's West End where it ran for 35 performances at the Piccadilly Theatre. The cast included Donald Davis and his brother and sister Murray Davis and Barbara Chilcott, for whom it had specially been written.

References

Bibliography
 Wearing, J.P. The London Stage 1950-1959: A Calendar of Productions, Performers, and Personnel.  Rowman & Littlefield, 2014.

1957 plays
Plays by J. B. Priestley
West End plays
Plays set in Canada
Plays set in the 1900s